Football is the most popular sports in Myanmar.

Early history
Football was introduced to Myanmar, then named Burma, by the British colonialists in the 1880s, when explorer James George Scott organised a match between the British and the Burmese in Lanmadaw Township. Football quickly became extremely popular across the country. So much so, that by the 1920s, Burmese started to spread the sport across East Asia. U Kyaw Din, a Burmese born in 1900, wrote one of the earliest books about the sport and promoted it so successfully in Japan that he became a member of the Japanese Football hall of fame posthumously in 2007.

In September 1926, the reportedly first women's football match was organised to raise funds for a charity.

Football governance
The Myanmar Football Federation (MFF) is the governing body of football in Myanmar. It was formed in 1947 as Burmese Football Federation and governs men's football since then and women's football since 1995.

The MFF joined FIFA in 1952 and AFC in 1954.

League system
The highest women's football league in the country is the Myanmar Women League. 
The highest men's football league is the Myanmar National League. The second division is called MNL-2

Cup system
There is currently no women's cup tournament in Myanmar. For the men's cup, see General Aung San Shield.

Men's National team

The Myanmar national team used to be among the top teams in Asia until the early 1970s. They won five consecutive editions of the Southeast Asian Games between 1965 and 1973 and the Asian Games in 1966 and 1970. In 1968, the team finished runners-up at the AFC Asian Cup, only losing to Iran in the final. Most notably, the Burmese national team, as it was called at the time, finished 9th at the 1972 Olympics in Munich after beating Sudan 2:0 and losing just 0:1 to later Bronze medalist Soviet Union. They did win the Fair Play Award at the Games. The national team never qualified for a FIFA World Cup.

Women's national team

The national team is one of the most successful in South East Asia, sitting in the third place of the All-Time Table of the AFF Women's Championship, which they won twice (2004 and 2007). They qualified for the AFC Women's Asian Cup on five occasions, missing only three tournaments, but never made it past the group stages.

Myanmar football clubs

Myanmar football stadiums

References

External links
Myanmar Football Federation

Football in Myanmar